John Thomas Wilmot Place (June 21, 1880 – December 29, 1952) was a Canadian politician. He served in the Legislative Assembly of British Columbia from 1912 to 1916  from the electoral district of Nanaimo City, a member of the Social Democratic Party.

References

1880 births
1952 deaths
British emigrants to Canada